Tom Black (born c. 1940) is a former motorcycle speedway rider from New Zealand.

Black began racing in the mid-1960s, and he won the South Island Championship in 1969 and 1970. He rode in the third Test of 1969/70 against England at Christchurch and also rode for New Zealand against Sweden in 1972. In 1973 he travelled to England where he rode for Teesside Tigers, but only rode in seven meetings before his season was ended by a broken collarbone and arm. After regaining his fitness in the 1973/74 New Zealand season, he returned to the UK in 1974 to ride for Leicester Lions. Disappointing results for Leicester saw him return to Teesside, but in his first match back for the team he suffered a broken ankle, ending his British league career. He continued to ride in New Zealand for several years before retiring.

References

New Zealand speedway riders
Middlesbrough Bears riders
Leicester Lions riders
Living people
1940 births

Year of birth uncertain